Andrzej Fedorowicz (born 21 January 1942) is a Polish actor. He has made over 10 appearances in film. He starred in the 1978 comedy film What Will You Do When You Catch Me?.

References

External links

1942 births
Living people
Polish male film actors